A Millbank bag is a portable water filtration device made of tightly woven canvas made for outdoor use. They are light, compact and easy but slow to use. The bag is filled with water, which filters through the canvas by gravity. It is useful for removing sediment and organic matter but the water may require further sterilisation before being drunk.

See also

LifeSaver bottle

References

Water filters
Drinking water